Jackfish Point 214 is an Indian reserve of the Dene Tha' First Nation in Alberta, located within Mackenzie County.

References

Mackenzie County
Indian reserves in Alberta